Zolotaya Dolina is a former airbase of the Russian Air Force located near Nakhodka, Primorsky Krai, Russia.

The base was home to the 47th Fighter Aviation Regiment between 1951 and 1998, and the 781st Fighter Aviation Regiment between 1953 and 1958.

References

Russian Air Force bases